The Lexington metropolitan area may refer to:

The Lexington, Kentucky metropolitan area, United States
The Lexington, Nebraska micropolitan area, United States

See also
Lexington (disambiguation)